Vjekoslav Kaleb (27 September 1905 – 13 April 1996) was a Croatian short story writer and novelist.

Biography
Kaleb was born in Tisno and educated in Zadar, Belgrade, Šibenik and Zagreb, where he attended Teacher’s Academy (today: Faculty of Teacher Education of the University of Zagreb). He later worked as a teacher in villages of the Zagora region in Croatia before joining the Partisans in 1943. After the World War II, Kaleb served as editor of many literary magazines (Književnik, Naprijed, Republika, Kolo) and secretary of the Croatian Writers’ Association and Matica hrvatska.

He has published 57 short stories and three novels, most of which deal with existential struggles of people in the remote hamlets of the rural Zagora during wartimes. The short story Gost (The Guest) is one of his first works (published in 1940), but also his best and most famous.

In addition to writing screenplays, articles and reviews, Kaleb was also a translator, his most notable work being the translation of Carlo Collodi’s Pinocchio. Kaleb’s works have also been translated into Albanian, English, French, German, Italian, Czech, Polish, Russian, Slovene and Macedonian.

Selected works

Short stories
Na kamenju (On the Stone), Zagreb 1940
Izvan stvari (Outside of Things), Zagreb 1942
Brigada (Brigade), Zagreb 1947
Trideset konja (Thirty Horses), Zagreb 1947
Kronika dana (Daily Chronicle), Zagreb 1949
Smrtni zvuci (Sounds of Death), Sarajevo 1957
Nagao vjetar (Hasty Wind), Zagreb 1959
Ogledalo (Mirror), Beograd 1962

Novels
Ponižene ulice (Humiliated Streets), Zagreb 1950
Divota prašine (The Beauty of Dust), Zagreb 1954
Bijeli kamen (White Stone), Zagreb, 1954

External links
Vjekoslav Kaleb at the Croatian Biographical Encyclopedia 

1905 births
1996 deaths
Croatian novelists
Male novelists
Croatian male short story writers
Croatian short story writers
Croatian male writers
People from the Kingdom of Dalmatia
University of Zagreb alumni
Croatian translators
Members of the Croatian Academy of Sciences and Arts
Vladimir Nazor Award winners
20th-century translators
20th-century novelists
20th-century short story writers
20th-century male writers